Mullamottum Munthiricharum is a 2012 Malayalam film directed by Aneesh Anwar, starring Indrajith, Meghana Raj and Ananya in lead roles. Mohan Sithara is the music director of the film.

Plot
Churatta Jose, a local goon and an expert snake catcher is stabbed on his stomach by someone at night. A flash back reveals his early life.

Cast
 Indrajith as Churatta Jose (Ousepp)
 Meghana Raj as Suchitra
 Ananya as Elizabeth (Ranimol)
 Thilakan as Vazhakkula Achan
 Ashokan as Tomichan
 Tini Tom as Sunnichan
 Kozhikode Narayanan Nair as Suchithra's and Sumithra's Father
 Praveena as Sumithra
 Anil Murali as Arumukhan, Sumithra's Husband
 Kochu Preman as Plaaparambil Kuriyakose (Kuriyachan), Ranimol's Father
 Kalashala Babu as Thankappan

References

External links
 
Watch on Gigaplex now

2012 films
2010s Malayalam-language films